The former U.S. territory of the Canal Zone first issued license plates in 1910, and this continued until the Canal Zone was returned to Panama in 1979. A single plate was issued for all years. The country of Panama also issued Canal Zone license plates for United States citizens that lived in Panama but worked in the Canal Zone, but these plates have the country name "Panama" clearly showing on them. Since reciprocity for license plates between the Canal Zone and Panama did not exist until 1950, old photos often show local vehicles with two different license plates mounted on the vehicle.

Passenger baseplates

1910 to 1955

1956 to 1979

Non-passenger plates

Miniature automobile license plate

Miniature automobile license plates were included in boxes of Wheaties cereal in 1953, and they are oftentimes called bicycle license plates. Included in one of the sets issued by General Mills was a Canal Zone license plate. Other plates in this set included the following locations: Alaska, District of Columbia, Dominican Republic, Guam, Hawaii, Italy-Military, Philippines, Virgin Islands, and the Maharajah plate with a golden double headed eagle. Note that all of the license plates issued for each state, province, territory, or country had the same serial number (Canal Zone plates all have the W3966 serial number).

See also

References

External links

Canal Zone
+Canal Zone
Panama transport-related lists
Road transport in Panama
Transport in Panama